Barry Bruce Powell (born 1942) is an American classical scholar. He is the Halls-Bascom Professor of Classics Emeritus at the University of Wisconsin–Madison, author of the widely used textbook Classical Myth and many other books. Trained at Berkeley and Harvard, he is a specialist in Homer and in the history of writing. He has also taught Egyptian philology for many years and courses in Egyptian civilization.

Work
His Writing: Theory and History of the Technology of Civilization (Wiley-Blackwell 2009) attempts to create a scientific terminology and taxonomy for the study of writing, and was described in Science as "stimulating and impressive" and "a worthy successor to the pioneering book by Semitic specialist I. J. Gelb." This book has been translated into Arabic and modern Greek. It expresses an unusual stance in that it rejects the standard theories of the origins of both Sumerian cuneiform and the Phoenician alphabet as deriving from pictograms.

Powell's study Homer and the Origin of the Greek Alphabet advances the thesis that a single man invented the Greek alphabet expressly in order to record the poems of Homer. This thesis is controversial. The book was the subject of an international conference in Berlin in 2002 and has been influential outside classical philology, especially in media studies. Powell's Writing and the Origins of Greek Literature follows up themes broached by the thesis.

Powell's textbook, Classical Myth (8th edition) is widely used for classical myth courses in America, Canada, Australia, New Zealand, and Taiwan, as his text The Greeks: History, Culture, Society (with Ian Morris) is widely used in ancient history classes. His text World Myth is popular in such courses.

Powell's critical study Homer is widely read as an introduction for philologists, historians, and students of literature. In this study, Powell suggested that Homer may have hailed from Euboea instead of Ionia.

A New Companion to Homer (with Ian Morris), also translated into modern Greek and Chinese, is a comprehensive review of modern scholarship on Homer.

His literary works include poetry (Rooms Containing Falcons), an autobiography (Ramses in Nighttown), a mock-epic (The War at Troy: A True History), an academic novel (A Land of Slaves: A Novel of the American Academy), a novel about Berkeley (The Berkeley Plan: A Novel of the Sixties), a novel about Jazz (Take Five, with Sanford Dorbin), and a collection of short fiction. He has published a memoir: Ramses Reborn. In Tales of the Trojan War he retells in a droll, sometimes ribald style, the stories attached to the Trojan cycle, based on ancient sources.

He has translated the Iliad and the Odyssey. The introduction to these poems discusses Powell's thesis about the Greek alphabet and the recording of Homer and is an influential review of modern Homeric criticism. He has also translated the Aeneid and the poems of Hesiod. His Greek Poems to the Gods includes translation and commentary on Greek hymns from Homer to Proclus.

Works

Books
 Composition by Theme in the Odyssey, Beiträge zur klassichen Philologie, 1974
 Homer and the Origin of the Greek Alphabet, Cambridge University Press, 1991
 A New Companion to Homer (with Ian Morris), E. J. Brill, 1995
 A Short Introduction to Classical Myth, Pearspm, 2000
 Writing and the Origins of Greek Literature, Cambridge University Press, 2003
 Homer, Wiley-Blackwell, 2004, 2nd ed. 2007
 Helen of Troy, Screenplay based on Margaret George novel. 2006
 Rooms Containing Falcons, poetry, 2006
 The War at Troy: A True History, mock-epic, 2006
 Ramses in Nighttown, a novel, 2006
 The Greeks: History, Culture, Society (with Ian Morris), Pearson, 2006, 2nd ed. 2009
 Writing: Theory and History of the Technology of Civilization, Wiley-Blackwell, 2009
 Ilias, Odysseia, Greek text with translation of Alexander Pope, Chester River Press 2009
 A Land of Slaves: A Novel of the American Academy, Orion Books 2011
 World Myth,  Pearson, 2013
 The Iliad,  Oxford University Press, 2013
 The Odyssey,  Oxford University Press, 2014
 Classical Myth, eighth edition, Pearson, 2014
 Homer's Iliad and Odyssey: The Essential Books, Oxford University Press, 2014
 Vergil's Aeneid, Oxford University Press, 2015
 Vergil's Aeneid: The Essential Books, Oxford University Press 2015
 The Berkeley Plan: A Novel of the Sixties, Orion Books 2016
 The House of Odysseus, and other short fictions, Orion Books 2016
 The Poems of Hesiod: Theogony, Works and Days, the Shield of Heracles, University of California Press 2017
 Take Five, A Story of Jazz in the Fifties (with Sanford Dorbin),  Telstar Books, 2017
 Ramses Reborn: A Memoir, Amazon Publications, 2017
 Tales of the Trojan War, Amazon Publications, 2017
 Greek Poems to the Gods, University of California Press, 2021

Articles
 "Did Homer Sing at Lefkandi?", Electronic Antiquity 1(2), July 1993 (online version)

Notes and references

External links
Personal page at University of Wisconsin–Madison (archived 2012)
Staff profile page at University of Wisconsin–Madison (archived 2019)

American classical scholars
Living people
Classical philologists
Classical scholars of the University of Wisconsin–Madison
1942 births
Translators of Homer
Homeric scholars